is a 2017 Japanese animated film produced by Kyoto Animation and Animation Do based on the animated television series Free!, which aired from 2013 to 2014. It is a sequel of Free! Eternal Summer and is the final part of Free! Timeless Medley'''s film trilogy project, consisting of an all-new original story that serves as a direct continuation to the compilation films. It is told in four episodic parts.

Plot

: Haruka Nanase, joined by Makoto Tachibana, looks for an apartment in Tokyo as he prepares to enter college. Kisumi Shigino, whose uncle owns a rental agency, helps him lease an apartment close to a pool. While visiting the apartment, Haruka and Makoto find a boy named Misaki, a young swimmer who was coached by the previous tenant, Nao Serizawa.

: While Aiichiro Nitori decides on a graduation present for Rin Matsuoka and Sosuke Yamazaki, Momotaro Mikoshiba wins tickets to the Anago Hot Springs, which they present to the two through an elaborate scavenger hunt. During the trip, Momotaro gets into a heated competition with the captain of Sofukan High School's swim team over a capybara plush toy. Natsuya Kirishima, an alumnus of Sofukan High School and chaperone to their training camp, offers wise words to Sosuke over his shoulder injury. On their way back Aiichiro and Momotaro give Rin and Sosuke two good luck charms as gifts.

: Rei Ryugazaki, Nagisa Hazuki, and Gou Matsuoka create a recruitment video for the swimming team for the upcoming school year. While filming, Gou finds an old recruitment manual left from the previous members of the club with the strategy "PKH East," which they believe to be resourceful for the video. They investigate to find out that it was the nickname for "Perfect Kinniku (Muscles) Handsome Azuma," a member of the swim team who had attracted many female members onto the team with his appearance. Though disappointed, the event inspires Rei to complete the video. Asahi Shiina makes a cameo in this segment during their investigation.

: While the Iwatobi High School and Samezuka Academy swim teams plan a surprise going-away party for Rin, who is leaving for Australia soon, Rin sees Gou and Momotaro together and assumes they are dating. He discovers that Momotaro plans to challenge him to a relay along with his older brother, Seijuro Mikoshiba, making him even more concerned about losing Gou. When Rin enlists Haruka for help, he reveals that Momotaro had wanted a toy Rin had gotten at a burger restaurant. Nevertheless, the two race against the Mikoshiba brothers. After winning the relay, the swim clubs celebrate Rin's departure. Meanwhile, Ikuya Kirishima and Hiyori Tono prepare for the upcoming time trials at their college.

In a post-credits scene, a message reads, "See you next stage", which was later revealed as a teaser for Free!'s third season, Dive to the Future.

Production

Kyoto Animation announced that a "new screen project" had been green-lit in a promotional video for the home release of High Speed! Free! Starting Days. Details were announced at an event on March 19, 2017, where it was announced that the project would consist of two compilation films of Free! Eternal Summer, the series' second season, titled Free! Timeless Medley. In addition to the two films, the project also included a third all-new original film sequel to the series and takes place where Haruka prepares to enter college, which serves as a transition to the series' third season, Free! Dive to the Future. The film is told in four episodic parts and was released in theaters on October 28, 2017. Free! Take Your Marks was released on DVD and Blu-ray on April 4, 2018.

Funimation acquired the rights for Free! Take Your Marks, along with High Speed! Free! Starting Days and Free! Timeless Medley for distribution in North America. A limited screening of Free! Take Your Marks was held on March 14, 2018 with English subtitles. All films were released as a set in October 2018.

ReceptionFree! Take Your Marks opened at #8 on its opening week. The film made  at box office. The limited edition of the Blu-ray release debuted at #1 on Oricon and sold 6,336 copies on its first week, while the regular edition debuted at #7 and sold 1,991 on its first week. The DVD release debuted at #2 and sold 3,592 copies on its first week.

Spencer Dakos from Anime News Network praised the film's comedic approach in revealing sides to the characters that were never seen before and noted that the film took a step away from the dramatic storytelling in High Speed! Free! Starting Days and Free! Eternal Summer. Jacob Chapman from Anime News Network cited the film's strengths as an "enjoyable comedy" that helps "ease fans gently into season three", but claimed that the film seemed like an original video animation and the change in director from Hiroko Utsumi to Eisaku Kawanami greatly affected the "atmosphere, drama, and fan service." Nick Creamer from Anime News Network'' praised it for integrating the comedic style of the show's first season, but felt that the narrative was not cohesive.

Soundtrack

The original soundtrack was produced by Tatsuya Kato, and it was released on November 29, 2017 under the name . The album peaked at #42 on the Oricon Weekly Albums Chart and charted for two weeks.

The opening theme song, "Free-style Spirit", was performed by Style Five, which consists of the voice actors for Haruka, Makoto, Nagisa, Rei, and Rin. Both songs were released as a double-A side single on November 8, 2017, which debuted on Oricon at #19 and charted for 5 weeks. They were later added on the original soundtrack album, along with all three versions of "What Wonderful Days!!"

References

External links
 

2010s Japanese films
2017 anime films
Animated films based on animated series
Japanese film series
2010s Japanese-language films
Funimation
Kyoto Animation
Films set in Tottori Prefecture